Ageratina, commonly known as snakeroot, is a genus of more than 330 perennials and rounded shrubs in the family Asteraceae.

These plants grow mainly in the warmer regions of the Americas and West Indies. Over 150 species are native to Mexico. Some flourish in the cooler areas of the eastern United States. Two Mexican species have become a pest in parts of Australia and Taiwan. Ageratina used to belong to the genus Eupatorium, but it has been reclassified.

The genus name Ageratina means "like Ageratum" and consists of Ageratum and -ina, the feminine form of the Latin adjectival suffix .

Description
The inflorescence consists of multiple fluffy, red or pinkish-white capitula in clusters. These lack the typical ray flowers of the composites.

They have multiple, much-branched woody stems. The petioles are rather long. The leaves are triangular, serrate and opposite with a foul-smelling, musky scent.

Species 
, Plants of the World online has 322 accepted species:

Ageratina acevedoana 
Ageratina acevedoi 
Ageratina adenophora 
Ageratina adenophoroides 
Ageratina aegirophylla 
Ageratina alexanderi 
Ageratina allenii 
Ageratina altissima 
Ageratina amblyolepis 
Ageratina ampla 
Ageratina anchistea 
Ageratina angustifolia 
Ageratina anisochroma 
Ageratina apollinairei 
Ageratina appendiculata 
Ageratina aracaiensis 
Ageratina arbutifolia 
Ageratina areolaris 
Ageratina aristeguietii 
Ageratina aristei 
Ageratina aromatica 
Ageratina arsenei 
Ageratina asclepiadea 
Ageratina astellera 
Ageratina atrocordata 
Ageratina austin-smithii 
Ageratina ayerscottiana 
Ageratina baccharoides 
Ageratina badia 
Ageratina barbensis 
Ageratina barclayae 
Ageratina barriei 
Ageratina beamanii 
Ageratina bellidifolia 
Ageratina bishopii 
Ageratina blepharilepis 
Ageratina bobjansenii 
Ageratina boekei 
Ageratina boyacensis 
Ageratina brandegeana 
Ageratina brevipes 
Ageratina burgeri 
Ageratina caeciliae 
Ageratina calaminthifolia 
Ageratina calophylla 
Ageratina campii 
Ageratina campylocladia 
Ageratina capazica 
Ageratina capillipes 
Ageratina cardiophylla 
Ageratina carmonis 
Ageratina cartagoensis 
Ageratina cerifera 
Ageratina chachapoyasensis 
Ageratina chazaroana 
Ageratina chimalapana 
Ageratina chiriquensis 
Ageratina choricephala 
Ageratina choricephaloides 
Ageratina colimana 
Ageratina collodes 
Ageratina concordiana 
Ageratina contigua 
Ageratina contorta 
Ageratina corylifolia 
Ageratina costaricensis 
Ageratina crassiceps 
Ageratina crassiramea 
Ageratina cremastra 
Ageratina croatii 
Ageratina cronquistii 
Ageratina cruzii 
Ageratina cuatrecasasii 
Ageratina cuencana 
Ageratina cuicatlana 
Ageratina cumbensis 
Ageratina cutervensis 
Ageratina cuzcoensis 
Ageratina cylindrica 
Ageratina dasyneura 
Ageratina davidsei 
Ageratina deltoidea 
Ageratina desquamans 
Ageratina dictyoneura 
Ageratina dillonii 
Ageratina diversipila 
Ageratina dolichobasis 
Ageratina dombeyana 
Ageratina dorrii 
Ageratina elegans 
Ageratina enixa 
Ageratina espinosarum 
Ageratina etlana 
Ageratina etlensis 
Ageratina ewanii 
Ageratina fastigiata 
Ageratina feuereri 
Ageratina flaviseta 
Ageratina fleischmannioides 
Ageratina flourensifolia 
Ageratina funckii 
Ageratina geminata 
Ageratina gentryana 
Ageratina gilbertii 
Ageratina glabrata 
Ageratina glandulifera 
Ageratina glauca 
Ageratina glechonophylla 
Ageratina glischra 
Ageratina gloeoclada 
Ageratina glyptophlebia 
Ageratina gonzalezorum 
Ageratina gracilenta 
Ageratina gracilis 
Ageratina grandifolia 
Ageratina grashoffii 
Ageratina guatemalensis 
Ageratina gynoxoides 
Ageratina gypsophila 
Ageratina haageana 
Ageratina halbertiana 
Ageratina harlingii 
Ageratina hartii 
Ageratina hasegawana 
Ageratina havanensis 
Ageratina hederifolia 
Ageratina helenae 
Ageratina henzium 
Ageratina herbacea 
Ageratina hernandezii 
Ageratina herrerae 
Ageratina hidalgensis Ageratina hirtella Ageratina huahuapana Ageratina huehueteca Ageratina humochica Ageratina hyssopina Ageratina ibaguensis Ageratina ilicifolia Ageratina illita Ageratina iltisii Ageratina infiernillensis Ageratina intercostulata Ageratina intibucensis Ageratina irrasa Ageratina isolepis Ageratina ixiocladon Ageratina jahnii Ageratina jaliscensis Ageratina jalpana Ageratina jalpanserra Ageratina jocotepecana Ageratina josepaneroi Ageratina josephensis Ageratina jucunda Ageratina juxtlahuacensis Ageratina killipii Ageratina kochiana Ageratina kupperi Ageratina lapsensis Ageratina lasia Ageratina lasioneura Ageratina latipes Ageratina leiocarpa Ageratina lemmonii Ageratina leptodictyon Ageratina liebmannii Ageratina ligustrina Ageratina lobulifera Ageratina lopez-mirandae Ageratina lorentzii Ageratina luciae-brauniae Ageratina lucida Ageratina macbridei Ageratina macdonaldii Ageratina macvaughii Ageratina mairetiana Ageratina malacolepis Ageratina manantlana Ageratina maranonii Ageratina markporteri Ageratina mayajana Ageratina mazatecana Ageratina megacephala Ageratina megaphylla Ageratina miahuatlana Ageratina microcephala Ageratina miquihuana Ageratina molinae  Ageratina moorei Ageratina mortoniana Ageratina muelleri Ageratina mutiscuensis Ageratina neohintonorium Ageratina neriifolia (Ageratina nesomii Ageratina nubicola Ageratina oaxacana Ageratina ocanensis Ageratina occidentalis Ageratina oligocephala Ageratina oppositifolia Ageratina oreithales Ageratina ovilla Ageratina ozolotepecana Ageratina palmeri Ageratina pampalcensis Ageratina paramensis Ageratina parayana Ageratina parviceps Ageratina paucibracteata Ageratina pauciflora Ageratina paupercula Ageratina pazcuarensis Ageratina pelotropha Ageratina pendula Ageratina pentlandiana Ageratina perezii Ageratina persetosa Ageratina petiolaris Ageratina photina Ageratina pichinchensis Ageratina pochutlana Ageratina popayanensis Ageratina potosina Ageratina pringlei Ageratina proba Ageratina prunellifolia Ageratina prunifolia Ageratina pseudochilca Ageratina pseudogracilis Ageratina psilodora Ageratina queretaroana Ageratina ramireziorum Ageratina ramonensis Ageratina rangelii Ageratina regalis Ageratina resiniflua Ageratina resiniflua Ageratina reticulifora Ageratina rhodopappa Ageratina rhodopoda Ageratina rhomboidea Ageratina rhypodes Ageratina rhytidodes Ageratina riparia Ageratina riskindii Ageratina rivalis Ageratina roanensis Ageratina robinsoniana Ageratina roraimensis Ageratina rosei Ageratina rothrockii  Ageratina rubicaulis Ageratina rupicola Ageratina salicifolia Ageratina saltillensis Ageratina salvadorensis Ageratina sandersii Ageratina saxorum Ageratina schaffneri Ageratina scopulorum Ageratina scordonioides Ageratina seleri Ageratina serboana Ageratina serrulata Ageratina shastensis Ageratina simulans Ageratina sodiroi Ageratina soejimana Ageratina solana Ageratina sotarensis Ageratina sousae Ageratina spooneri Ageratina standleyi Ageratina sternbergiana Ageratina stictophylla Ageratina stricta Ageratina subcordata Ageratina subcoriacea Ageratina subferruginea Ageratina subglabra Ageratina subinclusa Ageratina sundbergii Ageratina tambillensis Ageratina tarmensis Ageratina tejalapana Ageratina tenuis Ageratina textitlana Ageratina theifolia Ageratina thyrsiflora Ageratina tinifolia Ageratina tomentella Ageratina tonduzii Ageratina tovarae Ageratina trianae Ageratina triangulata Ageratina triniona Ageratina tristis Ageratina urbani Ageratina vacciniifolia Ageratina valerioi Ageratina vallincola Ageratina venulosa Ageratina vernalis Ageratina vernicosa Ageratina viburnoides Ageratina viejoana Ageratina villarrealii Ageratina villonacoensis Ageratina viscosa Ageratina viscosissima Ageratina warnockii Ageratina websteri Ageratina wrightii Ageratina wurdackii Ageratina yaharana Ageratina yecorana Ageratina zapalinama Ageratina zaragozana Ageratina zinniifolia Ageratina zunilana 

Selected synonyms:Ageratina conspicua  — synonym of Ageratina grandifolia Ageratina dendroides  — synonym of Raulinoreitzia crenulata 

 Toxicity

Milk from cows that have eaten snakeroot can cause illness if ingested because the milk becomes toxic.  Symptoms of milk sickness include vomiting.

 Medicinal Use Ageratina pichinchensis'' is a traditional Mexican treatment for superficial fungal infections of the skin. These plant extracts contain encecalin which has activity to inhibit and kill the fungus. Studies have compared its effectiveness in treating toenail fungus with ciclopirox.

Long used in India to treat snakebite, epilepsy, mental disorders. It was also discovered to be useful in regulating hypertension discovered in 1949, but it causes various side effects. Used to treat schizophrenia due to the alkaloid reserpine it contains.

There are many indigenous cultures that have used snakeroot for its ability to grow hair on the surface of the nose and tongue. One such use of snakeroot for this purpose comes from the practices of external alchemy as practiced in Daoism, because hair grown on the nose and tongue by the use of snakeroot is considered a place for one to absorb energy into the body from one's surroundings. Native Americans, Indigenous Siberians, and Indigenous tribes in Africa have also used snakeroot for these purposes.

References

External links 
 
 

 
Asteraceae genera